Corbridge is a railway station on the Tyne Valley Line, which runs between  and  via . It is owned by Network Rail and managed by Northern Trains.

History
The Newcastle and Carlisle Railway was formed in 1829, and was opened in stages.

Corbridge was reduced to an unstaffed halt in 1967, along with most of the other stations on the line that escaped the Beeching Axe. The original station buildings on the eastbound platform remain as a private residence.

In 2013, the original wrought and cast iron pre-grouping footbridge was replaced with a modern steel structure, similar in appearance to that of the one it replaced.

In October 2019, a platform at the station was extended ahead of the introduction of new rolling stock, as part of the Great North Rail project.

Facilities 
The station has two platforms, both of which have a ticket machine (which accepts card or contactless payment only), seating, waiting shelter, next train audio and visual displays and an emergency help point. There is step-free access to the Newcastle-bound platform only. There is a small car park at the station.

Corbridge is part of the Northern Trains penalty fare network, meaning that a valid ticket or promise to pay notice is required prior to boarding the train.

Services

All services are operated by Northern Trains.

Rolling stock used: Class 156 Super Sprinter and Class 158 Express Sprinter

References

External links 
 
 

Railway stations in Northumberland
DfT Category F1 stations
Former North Eastern Railway (UK) stations
Railway stations in Great Britain opened in 1835
Northern franchise railway stations
railway station